Hjørundfjord is a former municipality in Møre og Romsdal county, Norway. The municipality existed from 1838 until its dissolution in 1964. The  municipality is now a part of the municipality of Ørsta. The administrative centre was the village of Sæbø, located on the shores of the Hjørundfjorden.  The municipality encircled both sides of the Hjørundfjorden as well as the Bondalen valley.  The villages of Bjørke, Leira, and Store Standal were all a part Hjørundfjord Municipality.

History
The municipality was established on 1 January 1838 (see formannskapsdistrikt law). The original municipality was the same as the prestegjeld (parish) of Hjørundfjord. During the 1960s, there were many municipal mergers across Norway due to the work of the Schei Committee. On 1 January 1964, the three neighboring municipalities of Hjørundfjord (population: 1,728), Vartdal (population: 1,315), and Ørsta (population: 6,209) were merged into one large municipality, under the name Ørsta.

Government
All municipalities in Norway, including Hjørundfjord, are responsible for primary education (through 10th grade), outpatient health services, senior citizen services, unemployment and other social services, zoning, economic development, and municipal roads.  The municipality is governed by a municipal council of elected representatives, which in turn elects a mayor.

Municipal council
The municipal council  of Hjørundfjord was made up of 17 representatives that were elected to four year terms.  The party breakdown of the final municipal council was as follows:

Notable residents
Knut Skram (born 1937), baritone
Rasmus Skylstad (1893–1972), diplomat

See also
List of municipalities of Norway

References

External links

 Official website about Hjørundfjorden 

Ørsta
Former municipalities of Norway
1838 establishments in Norway
1964 disestablishments in Norway